Aleutians East Borough is a 2nd class borough in the U.S. state of Alaska. As of the 2020 census the borough's population was 3,420. The borough seat is Sand Point.

History
According to archaeological evidence, the area has been inhabited by the Aleuts since the last ice age. Early contact was with Russian fur traders who sought sea otters in these islands. Whaling, fishing and cannery operations brought an influx of Scandinavian and European fishermen in the early 1900s. During World War II, the area was a strategic military site for the Aleutian Campaign, and many locals were evacuated to Ketchikan.

Geography

Aleutians East Borough is located at 57° north latitude and 162° west longitude. It comprises the westernmost portion of the Alaska Peninsula, and a small number of the Aleutian Islands, from which the borough name derives. Also included are the Shumagin Islands, as well as the Pavlof Islands and the Sanak Islands. In all, about 63.9 percent of its land area comprises land on the Alaska Peninsula, while 36.1 percent is on the numerous islands. There are five incorporated cities and two unincorporated villages within the borough.

Temperatures range from -9 to 76 degrees Fahrenheit. Annual precipitation is 33 inches and annual snowfall is 52 inches.

National protected areas
 Alaska Maritime National Wildlife Refuge (parts of the Alaska Peninsula and Aleutian Islands units)
 Aleutian Islands Wilderness (part)
 Simeonof Wilderness
 Unimak Wilderness
 Alaska Peninsula National Wildlife Refuge (part)
 Izembek National Wildlife Refuge
 Izembek Wilderness

Adjacent boroughs and census areas
 Lake and Peninsula Borough, Alaska to the east
 Aleutians West Census Area, Alaska to the west

Demographics

At the 2000 census there were 2,697 people, 526 households, and 344 families residing in the borough. The population density was 0.386 people per square mile (0.149/km2). There were 724 housing units at an average density of 0 per square mile (0/km2). The racial makeup of the borough was 23.95% White, 1.67% Black or African American, 37.26% Native American, 26.51% Asian, 0.30% Pacific Islander, 7.38% from other races, and 2.93% from two or more races. 12.57% were Hispanic or Latino of any race. 22.25% reported speaking Tagalog at home, while 13.03% speak Spanish, 2.00% speak Ilokano, and 1.20% Aleut.

Of the 526 households 39.20% had children under the age of 18 living with them, 44.10% were married couples living together, 14.40% had a female householder with no husband present, and 34.60% were non-families. 27.40% of households were one person and 3.40% were one person aged 65 or older. The average household size was 2.69 and the average family size was 3.30.

The age distribution was 16.80% under the age of 18, 10.20% from 18 to 24, 42.30% from 25 to 44, 28.10% from 45 to 64, and 2.60% 65 or older. The median age was 37 years. For every 100 females, there were 184.80 males. For every 100 females age 18 and over, there were 207.70 males.

A 2014 analysis by The Atlantic found Aleutians East Borough to be the second most racially diverse county-equivalent in the United States, behind the Aleutians West Census Area.

As of the 2020 census, there were 3,420 people and 890 households residing in the borough. The population density was 0.49 people per square mile. There were 755 housing units at a density of 0.11 per square mile. The racial makeup was 43.4% Asian, 21.1% White, 20.2% American Indian or Alaska Native, 14.8% Hispanic or Latino, 10.2% African American, 1.2% Native Hawaiian or Pacific Islander, and 3.9% were from two or more races. 2.0% of the population was under the age of 5, 7.6% were under the age of 18, 81.9% were between the ages of 18 and 64, and 10.5% were 65 years old or older. 67.5% of the population were male and 32.5% were female. 4.2% of the population were veterans. The average household size was 2.61 people. 87.3% of households had a computer present with 62.4% having a broadband Internet connection. 85.5% of the population had a high school diploma or higher with 11.5% having a Bachelor's degree or higher. 5.1% of the population under the age of 65 had a disability with 23.3% of the same age group having no health insurance. 81.0% of the population over the age of 16 were in the civilian labor force. (77.6% of females) The median household income was $69,250 in 2019 dollars with the per capita income from May 2019 to April 2020 being $33,939 in 2019 dollars. The poverty rate in the borough was 14.8%.

Government and politics
Alvin D. Osterback is the mayor of the Aleutians East Borough. The borough has an elected assembly. Members of the assembly are Warren Wilson (King Cove), Paul Gronholdt (Sand Point), Chris Babcock (King Cove), Brenda Wilson (King Cove), Carol Foster (Sand Point), Josephine Shangin (Akutan), and Denise Mobeck (Sand Point). There are three advisory members, Dailey Schaack (Cold Bay), Samantha McNeley (Nelson Lagoon), and Tom Hoblet (False Pass). There is also an elected school board.

There are seven schools located in the Borough, with 273 students enrolled. 

The Sand Point Clinic is managed by Eastern Aleutian Tribes, Inc. and inhabited a new facility in 2006.  The clinic is staffed by low-level professionals and Community Health Aide/Practitioners (CHAs).  The CHA role is unique to Alaska and Native Health Care.

Economy
The borough's economy is cash-based. Commercial fishing and fish processing dominate and occur almost year-round. 222 borough residents hold commercial fishing permits. Sand Point is home to the largest fishing fleet in the Aleutian Chain. Salmon and Pacific cod processing occur at Peter Pan Seafoods (Port Moller and King Cove), Trident Seafoods (Sand Point and Akutan), and Bering Pacific (False Pass). The Peter Pan cannery in King Cove is one of the largest operations under one roof in Alaska. Transportation and other services provide year-round employment.

Transportation
Several airports are accessible in the Borough, and float planes can land in many communities. Marine cargo vessels also provide transportation. The State Ferry operates during the summer. Local transportation is primarily by fishing boats or skiffs since there are no roads.

Communities

Cities
 Akutan
 Cold Bay
 False Pass
 King Cove
 Sand Point (Borough Seat)

Census-designated place
 Nelson Lagoon

Other places
 Belkofski
 Pauloff Harbor
 Unga

See also

 List of airports in the Aleutians East Borough
 National Register of Historic Places listings in Aleutians East Borough, Alaska

References

External links
 Official site
 Aleutians East Borough at the Community Database Online from the Alaska Division of Community and Regional Affairs
 Maps from the Alaska Department of Labor and Workforce Development: 2010

 
Alaska boroughs
Bering Sea
1987 establishments in Alaska